The Rubberbodies Collective (RBC), stylised the rubberbodies collective, is a dance and theatre group that was founded on the Mediterranean island of Malta in 2009 following a series of improvisational workshops and the subsequent production of Grace u Rofflu.

Since 2010, The Rubberbodies Collective have been recognised as one of Malta's national creative groups and images of their work were included in the Maltese cultural policy.

Notable productions
In 2012 The Rubberbodies Collective produced an interactive installation entitled -hEx: inverting geometry. This installation formed a part of Malta's, 2012 Science in the City, festival.

The rbc also collaborated with dance performer, Athansia Kanellopoulou, on the production of, "Penelope: Dust of our awakened dreams" (MITP, Valletta).
On the 23rd of March rbc member Mario Sammut (Cygna) performed Malta's first “silent concert”, held in a circa 5600-year-old temple, in collaboration with the French composer Vincent Villuis. Hagar Qim temples.

In 2012, the rbc ran the performance Old Salt, a theatre work for Malta's National Art Festival that was made in collaboration with Liam Gauci of the National Maritime Museum.

 Mrs Stork's Mysterious Egg (Theatre, 2013) Commission of 
 Old Salt (Theater, 2012),
 Oracle (Concert, 2012),
 Penelope Dust in Our Awakened Dreams (Dance, 2012) [In collaboration with Athanasia Kanellopoulou],
 The Liquid Shark Tooth (Video Installation, 2011),
 Dun Karm (Theater, 2011) [performances by Chris Galea, Mavin Khoo, Jacob Piccinino, and Ninette Micallef],
 Lore of the Sea – immemorial waters (Theatre, 2011)
 EUR – 908 (Film, 2011) [In collaboration with Anthony Askew and Ellen Pillow],
 White Sea (Theater, 2011),
 100 : AVE | EVA | SUMMER | WINTER (Theater, 2010),
 100 (Film, 2010),
 A Revisitation of Grace u Rofflu (Theater, 2010),
 Grace|Rofflu (Theater, 2009)

References

External links
 

Theatre companies in Malta
Dance companies